James Kirkwood (August 8, 1845 – July 15, 1933) was a politician in Ontario, Canada. He represented Wellington East in the Legislative Assembly of Ontario from 1891 to 1894 as a Liberal.

The son of James Kirkwood and Agnes Davidson, he was born in Erin township. He served on the township council for twelve years, serving three years as reeve. From 1902 to 1905, Kirkwood served as police constable for East Nipissing. He served as secretary for both the Erin Agricultural Society and the East Wellington Farmer's Institute. Kirkwood was elected to the Ontario assembly in an 1891 by-election held after Charles Clarke resigned his seat.

In 1871, he married Agnes McDonald; the couple had six children.

References

External links

1845 births
1933 deaths
Ontario Liberal Party MPPs